Luca Moro (born 25 January 2001) is an Italian football player who plays as a forward who plays for  club Frosinone, on loan from Sassuolo.

Club career
He made his Serie B debut for Padova on 6 April 2019 in a game against Carpi, as an 82nd-minute substitute for Nico Pulzetti.

On 2 September 2019, he was loaned by Genoa and assigned to their Under-19 squad.

On 26 September 2020, he was loaned to SPAL, once again being assigned to the Under-19 squad. He was soon moved to the senior squad and made his debut for SPAL on 24 October 2020 against Vicenza.

On 31 August 2021, he was loaned to Serie C club Catania.

On 31 January 2022, his rights were bought by Sassuolo, who loaned him back to Catania for the remainder of the 2021–22 season. His loan was cut short on 9 April 2022, following Catania's exclusion from the Serie C league due to financial issues.

On 4 July 2022, Moro was loaned to Frosinone for the 2022–23 season.

References

External links
 

2001 births
Living people
Sportspeople from the Province of Padua
Footballers from Veneto
Italian footballers
Association football forwards
Serie B players
Serie C players
Calcio Padova players
Genoa C.F.C. players
S.P.A.L. players
Catania S.S.D. players
U.S. Sassuolo Calcio players
Frosinone Calcio players
21st-century Italian people